Min-hyuk is a Korean masculine given name.  Its meaning differs based on the hanja used to write each syllable of the name. There are 27 hanja with the reading "min" and nine hanja with the reading "hyuk" on the South Korean government's official list of hanja which may be registered for use in given names.

People
People with this name include:

Entertainers
Jang Min-hyeok (born 1978), South Korean voice actor
Kang Min-hyuk (born 1991), South Korean musician and actor, member of boy band CNBLUE
Lee Min-hyuk (rapper, born 1990), South Korean singer, member of boy band BtoB
Lee Min-hyuk (born 1990), stage name B-Bomb, South Korean singer, member of boy band Block B
Lee Min-hyuk (singer, born 1993), South Korean singer, member of boy band Monsta X
Park Min-hyuk (born 1999), stage name Rocky, South Korean singer, member of boy band Astro
Ji Min-hyuk (born 2001), South Korean actor

Sportspeople
Gang Min-hyeok (born 1981), South Korean alpine skier
Kang Min-hyuk (footballer) (born 1982), South Korean football midfielder (K-League Challenge)
Cho Min-hyeok (born 1987), South Korean tennis player
Kim Min-hyeok (footballer, born February 1992), South Korean football midfielder (K-League Classic)
Kim Min-hyeok (footballer, born August 1992), South Korean football defender (J-League Division 1)
Lim Min-hyuk (born 1994), South Korean football goalkeeper (K League 1)
Ko Min-hyuk (born 1996), South Korean football defender (K League 1)
Kim Min-hyeok (baseball) (born 1996), South Korean baseball infielder
Lim Min-hyeok (born 1997), South Korean football midfielder (K League 1 and youth national team)
Kang Min-hyuk (badminton) (born 1999), South Korean badminton player

Fictional characters
Fictional characters with this name include:
Yoo Min-hyuk, in 2004 South Korean television series Full House
Oh Min-hyuk, in 2011 South Korean television series Poseidon
Min-hyuk, in 2012 South Korean television series Salamander Guru and The Shadows
Shin Min-hyuk, in 2012 South Korean television series Cheongdam-dong Alice
Jo Min-hyuk, in 2013 South Korean television series Secret Love
Ahn Min-hyuk, in 2017 South Korean television series Strong Woman Do Bong-soon
Lee Min-hyuk, in 2020 South Korean television series The Penthouse: War in Life

See also
List of Korean given names

References

Korean masculine given names